The Sunflower: On the Possibilities and Limits of Forgiveness is a book on the Holocaust by Holocaust survivor Simon Wiesenthal, in which he recounts his experience with a mortally wounded Nazi during World War II. The book describes Wiesenthal's experience in the Lemberg concentration camp and discusses the moral ethics of the  decisions he made. The title comes from Wiesenthal's observation of a German military cemetery, where he saw a sunflower on each grave, and fearing his own placement in an unmarked mass grave. The book's second half is a symposium of answers from various people, including other Holocaust survivors, religious leaders and former Nazis. The book was originally published in German by Opera Mundi in Paris, France in 1969. The first English translation was published in 1970.

Synopsis
In 1943, at the height of both World War II and the Holocaust, a group of forced labourers from the Lemberg concentration camp are sent to a converted army hospital to clear medical waste. Simon Wiesenthal is summoned from this work detail by a nurse to the bedside of a dying Nazi soldier, Karl Seidl (identified only as Karl S. in earlier editions). The soldier tells him he is seeking "a Jew's" forgiveness for a crime that has haunted Seidl since it was committed one year prior. Over a number of hours, Seidl tells Wiesenthal his life story, including joining Hitler Youth and his experiences in the SS. He then confesses to having participated in the destruction, by fire and armaments, of a house full of 300 Jews. He states that as the Jews tried to leap out of windows to escape the burning building, he and the other soldiers gunned them down.

After Seidl finishes his story, he asks Wiesenthal to forgive him. Wiesenthal then leaves the room without saying anything. The next day, the nurse informs Wiesenthal that the soldier has died. The nurse tells him that Seidl has left his belongings to him, but Wiesenthal refuses to take them, telling the nurse to have them sent to Seidl's mother. Wiesenthal ruminates on whether or not he should have forgiven Seidl through the rest of his experiences in the concentration camp system. After the war, he finds Seidl's mother, who in their conversation unintentionally confirms the details of her son's story. Seidl's mother asks him how he knew his son, but Wiesenthal lies and leaves without telling her of her late son's participation in the Holocaust. He then poses the ethical dilemma of whether or not he should have forgiven Seidl to the reader, after which a variety of responses from a diverse group of individuals is given.

Responses 
In the latest edition of the book, there are 53 responses given from various people, up from 10 in the original edition. Among respondents to the question are theologians, political leaders, writers, jurists, psychiatrists, human rights activists, Holocaust survivors, former Nazis and victims of attempted genocides in Bosnia, Cambodia, China and Tibet. The responses vary. Some respondents write that forgiveness ought to be awarded for the victims' sake; others respond that it should be withheld. Others do not say definitively whether or not forgiveness was the right thing.

List of responses

References

External links
 Book review at academic.kellogg.edu

1969 non-fiction books
Personal accounts of the Holocaust
Simon Wiesenthal